Pelican Stars F.C. is a women's association football club based in Calabar, Cross River State. They play in the Nigeria Women's Football League Championship, the second division for women's football in the country. 

In 2015, the team protested against the government for inadequate funding for the club. In 2016, a spokesman for the club revealed to News Agency of Nigeria that new organizational changes in the club will re-position it to redeem its glorious years. In 2017, they defeated newly promoted side, Sa'adatu Amazons F.C. in their first game of the season.

Notable former players 
 Chinwendu Ihezuo

References 

Women's football clubs in Nigeria
Association football clubs established in 1990
Nigeria Women Premier League clubs
1990 establishments in Nigeria
Calabar
NWFL Premiership clubs